Noršinci is a roadside village south of Martjanci in the Municipality of Moravske Toplice in the Prekmurje region of Slovenia.

The writer and poet János Kardos was born in the village.

References

External links
Noršinci on Geopedia

Populated places in the Municipality of Moravske Toplice